Maneklal Chunilal Shah was an Indian politician. He was a Member of Parliament, representing Gujarat in the Rajya Sabha the upper house of India's Parliament representing the Indian National Congress.

References

Rajya Sabha members from Gujarat
1896 births
Year of death missing